The term participating consciousness was introduced by cultural historian Morris Berman in The Reenchantment of the World (1981) expanding on Owen Barfield's concept of "original participation," to describe an ancient mode of human thinking that does not separate the perceiver from the world he or she perceives. Berman says that this original world view has been replaced during the past 400 years with the modern paradigm called Cartesian, Newtonian, or scientific, which depends on an isolated observer, proposing that we can understand the world only by distancing ourselves from it.

Max Weber, early 20th-century German sociologist, was concerned with the "disenchantment" he associated with the rise of modernity, capitalism, and scientific consciousness. Berman traces the history of this disenchantment. He argues that the modern consciousness is destructive to both the human psyche and the planetary environment. Berman challenges the supremacy of the modern world view and argues for some new form of the older holistic tradition, which he describes as follows:

The concept of participating consciousness has been used and further developed by philosophers and analytical psychologists, among others, and the idea of re-enchantment is a recurring theme among scholars. Some compare participating consciousness to the thinking of non-Western indigenous peoples. Others link it to esoteric traditions or religious thought.

See also
Mental fact
Morris Berman

References 

Consciousness studies